Epsilon Persei, Latinized from ε Persei, is a multiple star system in the northern constellation of Perseus. It has a combined apparent visual magnitude of +2.88, which is bright enough to be viewed with the naked eye. Based upon parallax measurements, this system is located at a distance of roughly 640 light-years (196 parsecs) from Earth.

This is a spectroscopic binary system, which means that the presence of an orbiting companion has been revealed by radial velocity variations in the spectrum of the primary. The two components are orbiting each other with a period of 14 days at a high orbital eccentricity of 0.55. The secondary component has about 6–13% of the primary's mass and may have a stellar classification in the range from A6 V to K1 V. There may be a third component to this system with an orbital period of roughly 9,428 days (25.8 years), although this has not been conclusively demonstrated. If this component exists, it would have about 51–139% of the primary's mass. This high level of uncertainty is because the inclination of the orbit is not known.

The primary component of this system, Epsilon Persei A, is a massive star with 12–16 times the Sun's mass and near eight times the radius of the Sun. It has a stellar classification of B0.5 V, making it a B-type main sequence star that is generating energy at its core through the nuclear fusion of hydrogen. Component A is radiating over 28,000 times the Sun's luminosity from its outer envelope at an effective temperature of 26,500 K. This gives the star the blue-white hue that is typical of B-type stars.

Epsilon Persei A is a Beta Cephei variable star with a primary pulsation period of 0.1603 days, or 6.24 cycles per day. It may have multiple pulsation frequencies.

References

External links
 Al-Thurayya
 

B-type main-sequence stars
Beta Cephei variables
Alpha Persei Cluster
Perseus (constellation)
Persei, Epsilon
Durchmusterung objects
Persei, 45
024760
018532
1220
Spectroscopic binaries